Daisy Al-Amir, often referred to as simply Dayzi Amir, is an Iraqi writer, poet and novelist. She is author of The Waiting List: An Iraqi Woman's Tales of Alienation has renowned her as one of the leading female writers of Iraq.

Biography 
Daisy Al-Amir was born in Alexandria, Egypt in 1935 to an Iraqi father and a Lebanese mother. Her family did not stay in Egypt for very long, moving to her father’s homeland Iraq when she was only a few weeks old. After earning her Bachelor’s Degree from the Teachers’ Training College of Baghdad, Daisy al-Amir went to Cambridge to study and write her thesis on Arabic Literature. Her father refused to pay tuition, however, and on her trip home, she stopped in Beirut where she found a job as a secretary in the Iraqi embassy. She chose to remain in Beirut. She was eventually promoted to the job of Assistant Press Attaché.
In 1975, when the civil war broke out in Lebanon, she was appointed director of the Iraqi Cultural Center.  She returned to Iraq in 1982 after the Israeli invasion of Lebanon. Her stories reflect women’s experiences during turbulent times in the Middle East including during the Lebanese civil war, and during the rise to power of Saddam Hussein in Iraq. Daisy al-Amir is the author of five published works including: Al Balad al-Baid Alladhi Tuhibbuhu (The Distant Country that You Love), 1964, Thumma Tauda al-Mawja (Then the Wave Returns), 1969, Fi Dawwamat al-Hubb wa al-Karahiya (In the Vortex of Love and Hate), 1979 and Wu'ud li-l-bay' (Promises for Sale, 1981) about the Lebanese civil war, and Ala la’ihat al-intizar, (The Waiting List: An Iraqi Woman’s Tales of Alienation), 1994.

Here the alienation is that of a cultural refugee, a divorced woman who is educated, affluent, and alone.

Al-Amir's prose is influenced by a long tradition of Iraqi poetry.

Bibliography
 The Waiting List: An Iraqi Woman's Tales of Alienation 
 An Andalusian Tale
 The Distant Country that You Love
 Then the Wave Returns
 In the Vortex of Love and Hate
 Promises for Sale

References

External links
 Arab personalities
Arab writers in English 

1935 births
Living people
People from Basra
20th-century Iraqi poets
Iraqi women poets
Iraqi people of Lebanese descent
20th-century Iraqi writers 
20th-century Iraqi women writers 
21st-century Iraqi writers 
21st-century Iraqi women writers